Sean Carrigan (born May 16, 1974) is an American actor, producer, stand-up comedian, and former professional boxer best known for his turn as Dr. Ben "Stitch" Rayburn on the hit CBS daytime drama The Young and the Restless. Carrigan is also the co-founder of the production company Woodhead Entertainment.

Career
Carrigan started his career as a professional boxer in 1998, and ended it in 1999. Since then, he has appeared in numerous films, TV shows and commercials, and can be seen doing stand-up comedy across North America.

In May 2013, he was hired for a four episode arc as Dr. Ben "Stitch" Rayburn on the CBS television soap opera The Young and the Restless, his first airdate being June 28. After serving as a recurring character for almost half a year he was offered a contract in November 2013.

In addition to the Y&R, Sean has appeared in numerous television productions including Netflix's "American Vandal", and "Lucifer", ABC's "Grey's Anatomy", and "Modern Family", The CW Network's "Hart of Dixie", and Lifetime's "Call Me Crazy", starring opposite Academy Award Winner Jennifer Hudson and directed by Ashley Judd. Sean can also be seen in feature films including 20th Century Fox’s “Ford v Ferrari”,  Tyler Perry's “The Single Moms Club", and The Walt Disney Company's "John Carter".

Carrigan is co-founder of the production company Woodhead Entertainment which focuses on original shorts, branded media and feature films. With Woodhead Entertainment, Sean contributes as both a producer and actor. His comedic performance as Brett Favre in the viral parody hit "Brett Favre: Rise - What should I do?" gained over 4 million online views and has garnered him great reviews.

Filmography

External links
Biography at CBS - The Young and the Restless

References

Living people
1974 births
American male film actors
American male soap opera actors
American male television actors
American television personalities
American male comedians
American television producers
20th-century American male actors
21st-century American male actors
20th-century American comedians
21st-century American comedians